"Hotel Walls" is a song recorded by Swedish group Smith & Thell, and released as a single in July 2019.

Charts

Weekly charts

Year-end charts

Certifications

References

2019 singles
2019 songs
Smith & Thell songs
Songs written by Joakim Berg
Songs written by A7S